Revenge: A Love Story is a 2010 Hong Kong film written and directed by Wong Ching-Po.

Cast
 Juno Mak as Chan Kit
 Sola Aoi as Cheung Wing
 Candy Cheung as Ling
 Chin Siu-ho
 Tony Ho
 Tony Liu

Reception

Catherine Shoard in The Guardian called it a "baffling, grotesque horror that fails to validate its shocks" and gave it one star.

References

External links

 

2010 films
2010s crime films
Hong Kong crime films
Films directed by Wong Ching-po
Rape and revenge films
Films about police misconduct
2010s Hong Kong films